The 2017 NCAA Division II football season, part of college football in the United States organized by the National Collegiate Athletic Association (NCAA) at the Division II level, began on August 31, 2017 and ended with the Division II championship on December 16, 2017 at Children's Mercy Park in Kansas City, Kansas. Northwest Missouri State were the defending champions from the previous season. Texas A&M–Commerce won the school's first Division II National Championship and second overall.

Coverage of the Division 2 Playoffs were on ESPN 3, ESPN's streaming service up until the championship in which was broadcast on ESPN 2.

Conference changes and new programs

Membership changes

Oklahoma Baptist completed their transition to Division II and became eligible for the postseason.

Regional realignment

The GNAC and NSIC moved from Super Region 3 to Super Region 4, while the GLIAC and GLVC moved in the opposite direction. The newly-expanded G-MAC joined Super Region 1, replacing the CIAA, which moved to Super Region 2.

Conference standings

Super Region 1

Super Region 2

Super Region 3

Super Region 4

Postseason

The 2017 NCAA Division II Football Championship was the 45th edition of the Division II playoffs. The playoffs began on November 18 and concluded with the championship game on December 16.

The field consisted of 28 teams, seven from each of the four super regions. The participants in each region were determined by the regional rankings; if a conference's highest-ranked team was ranked in the top eight, that team qualified via the "earned access" provision, and all other participants were selected directly from the rankings. The top seed in each region received a first-round bye. After the quarterfinals, the regional winners were reseeded one through four, with No. 1 meeting No. 4 in the semifinals and No. 2 meeting No. 3.

Bracket

Bowl games

See also
2017 NCAA Division II football rankings
2017 NCAA Division I FBS football season
2017 NCAA Division I FCS football season
2017 NCAA Division III football season
2017 NAIA football season

References